The World Group was the highest level of Davis Cup competition in 2003. The first-round losers went into the Davis Cup World Group Play-offs, and the winners progress to the quarterfinals. The quarterfinalists were guaranteed a World Group spot for 2004.

Participating Teams

Draw

First round

Romania vs. France

Netherlands vs. Switzerland

Australia vs. Great Britain

Sweden vs. Brazil

Croatia vs. United States

Spain vs. Belgium

Argentina vs. Germany

Czech Republic vs. Russia

Quarterfinals

France vs. Switzerland

Sweden vs. Australia

Spain vs. Croatia

Argentina vs. Russia

Semifinals

Australia vs. Switzerland

Spain vs. Argentina

Final

Australia vs. Spain

Anthem incident
Himno de Riego, an obsolete anthem of Spain, was played in the Australia vs Spain match. Juan Antonio Gomez Angulo, Spain's sport minister, left the stadium in protest and returned after the organizer apologized. For similar incidents, see list of wrong anthems incidents.

References

World Group
Davis Cup World Group